For Better or For Worse is a comic strip by Lynn Johnston that ran originally from 1979 to 2008 chronicling the lives of the Patterson family and their friends, in the town of Milborough, a fictional suburb of Toronto, Ontario.  Now running as reruns, For Better or For Worse is still seen in over 2,000 newspapers throughout Canada, the U.S. and around twenty other countries.

History and background
Johnston's strip began in September 1979, and ended its original daily black-and-white run on August 30, 2008, with a postscript epilogue (as a full-colour Sunday strip) running the following day. Starting on September 1, 2008, the strip began re-telling its original story, using a mixture of straight reruns and retouched strips which featured altered dialogue.  This new format, however, was dropped after less than two years and in July 2010, the strip switched entirely to reruns (with some minor alterations). The strips seen in papers in 2016 were originally from 1987.

A signature element of For Better or For Worse during its original run was that the characters aged in real time.  The strip's title is a reference to the marriage service found in the Anglican Book of Common Prayer as well as in the wedding ceremonies of other faith traditions:

...to have and to hold from this day forward, for better for worse, for richer for poorer, in sickness and in health...

Johnston's work on the comic strip earned her a Reuben Award in 1985 and made her a nominated finalist for a Pulitzer Prize in editorial cartooning in 1994. The strip led the Friends of Lulu to add Johnston to the Women Cartoonists Hall of Fame in 2002. In the same year, Will Eisner described For Better or For Worse as "the best strip around currently," saying "It's humane, human, it has humor to it, and good artwork."

Characters

Original characters
The strip focuses on a family known as the Pattersons:

 Elly Patterson (née Richards) is a stressed woman yet loving wife and mother of three.  Elly tried night classes, writing columns for a small local paper, and periodically filling in as a dental assistant in John's office before landing a job in a library. Nearing menopause, Elly was surprised to learn she was pregnant with their daughter, April. After the library job ended, Elly began working in a book store which she and John eventually bought and expanded to include toys and hobby supplies (such as model railroads).  She then sold the store to her friend and began retirement.
 John Patterson, husband to protagonist Elly, and father. A mild-mannered dentist and loyal family man who is a big kid at heart. Over time he develops interests in cars and model railroads, even going so far as to try and run them through the house and back to his workshop.
 Michael Patterson began the strip as a rambunctious preschooler, who grew from a fresh little boy to a sullen teenager and became a good, mature young man. Michael became a freelance writer, married to his childhood crush Deanna Sobinski and is a father to daughter Meredith and son Robin.
 Elizabeth Patterson began the strip as a bratty and demanding toddler, growing to a cute little girl, to an awkward pre-teen, to a confident and bright young woman. When the original series of strips ended, she was a teacher who had just married her old friend Anthony Caine and became stepmother to his daughter, Françoise. Elizabeth gave birth to a son, James Allen Caine, whom she and her husband named in honour of her dying grandfather.

In 1991, a third child was born:
 April Patterson, so-called because she was born on April Fool's Day, 1991. She nearly drowned during a spring flood when she was four years old: the family sheepdog Farley lost his own life while saving her. She developed over the years into a bright tomboy who was a talented musician with a love of animals. When the original series ended, she was about to go off to university to study veterinary medicine.

As John and Elly's children grew older, the strip began to focus on neighbours and friends as well, creating an ever-changing roster of characters.

The comic's main characters were initially based upon Johnston's real family, but Johnston has made significant changes. When her children were younger, she asked their permission before depicting events from their lives; and she only once used a "serious" story from their lives, when Michael and Josef photographed an accident before Michael realized he knew the victim. Unlike Deanna, the real-life victim did not survive. Johnston says that she dealt with the bad news of her own infertility by creating a new child (April Patterson) for the strip.

Key storylines
The fictional suburban town of Milborough is located near Lake Simcoe. On the For Better or For Worse website, Milborough is described as being about a 45-minute to one-hour drive from Toronto and resembling Newmarket or Etobicoke, and a location map places the town on Highway 12 near Cannington and Beaverton in the northernmost part of Durham Region. The family's house is located on Sharon Park Drive. 

Otherwise, the Canadian aspects of the strip's story setting is usually presented subtly in details such as the presence of institutions such as Canada Post and practices like the family buying milk in milk bags, a common packaging in Ontario for that grocery item. However, one major exception Johnston indulged in was having Michael take his post-secondary education in the city of London, Ontario, a mid-sized city 300 km west of Toronto. Johnston chose that setting considering a native of the province of Ontario could choose that city with its major educational institutions like Fanshawe College and the University of Western Ontario, while its distance would allow Michael to have some length from his parents; yet still be within driving distance for vacations and summer breaks.  Furthermore, Johnston also intended that story turn as partially a prank, anticipating ignorant readers to assume that Michael was studying in the city of London in Britain and enjoying imagining those people being embarrassed when the regional geography is explained to them. Johnston later confessed it had backfired on her and she had been fooled along with her targeted crowd when she got a congratulatory letter from Texas along with an earlier strip showing Michael in a cowboy hat, saying the Lone Star State would be a great place to tend to his education. Johnston jokingly remarked she got a taste of her own medicine and realization she did not know all regional geography, due to the other community of the same name. For their part, the citizenry of London, Ontario welcomed their city's inclusion in the strip, including an official welcome from the University of Western Ontario when Michael switched to that institution.

In the comic's quarter century, the strip has featured a variety of storylines, as the characters and their friends age. These include Elly's return to the paid work force ("The Last Straw"), John's midlife crisis, the birth of a friend's six-fingered daughter ("Keep The Home Fries Burning"), Elizabeth wearing glasses ("What, Me Pregnant"), friends' divorces and relocating to distant towns, the coming out of Michael's best friend Lawrence Poirier ("There Goes My Baby"), child abuse (perpetrated by Gordon's alcoholic parents), the death of Elly's mother Marian Richards ("Sunshine and Shadow"), and Elizabeth's experience with sexual harassment and assault at the hands of a co-worker ("Home Sweat Home").

The strip has shown a multiracial cast, intended to reflect Canada's demographics. While the Pattersons are a typical white English-speaking family, there have been recurring characters of different backgrounds, including Caribbean immigrants, Asian, Latin American, Franco-Ontarian and First Nations cultures. Elizabeth's favourite high school teacher, who inspired her to study education herself, was paraplegic.

Other issues are also addressed. During her second year at college, Elizabeth moves in with her boyfriend, Eric Chamberlain, but promises not to cohabit. Elizabeth later breaks up with Eric when she finds out he is cheating on her. Storylines sometimes concern the Pattersons dealing with difficult acquaintances such as Thérèse, the ex-wife of Elizabeth's friend Anthony, who resents Elizabeth's presence, or the helicopter parenting of Deanna's mother, Mira Sobinski.

Farley's death
Since the comic happens in real time, it became apparent that the Pattersons' first Old English Sheepdog, Farley, was starting to get fairly old. When he is fourteen years old (18 April 1995), Farley saves four-year-old April from drowning in a stream near the Patterson home. Farley cannot take the shock of the cold water or the exertion of saving April and dies of a heart attack.

The death provoked a lot of reaction from fans.  "People's emotions were kind of raw," said Johnston of the time. "I received 2,500 letters, about one-third negative. I didn't expect the response to be so great. The letters were open and emotional and honest and personal, full of stories and love."

When Johnston told fellow cartoonist (and close friend) Charles M. Schulz that Farley was going to die, Schulz jokingly "threatened to have Snoopy hit by a truck if Johnston went through with the plan". In the end, Johnston kept the timing of Farley's death a secret from Schulz.

The official For Better or For Worse website has a section dedicated to Farley; this includes the strips depicting his heroism and death, plus a selection of "Farley's Spirit" strips.  Farley was also named after Canadian author Farley Mowat, a long-time friend of Johnston.

Johnston has allowed the Ontario Veterinary Medical Association (OVMA) to use Farley's name and likeness for the "Farley Foundation", a charity established by OVMA to subsidize the cost of veterinary care for pets of low-income seniors and persons with disabilities in Ontario.

Lawrence comes out

Michael Boncoeur, a friend of Johnston's, had been murdered in Toronto in 1991. Although the murder was not over Boncoeur's homosexuality, there were some homophobic attitudes seen in the media coverage of it, and Johnston felt that a gay character should be brought into the strip to help combat anti-gay stereotypes and discrimination. 

In April 1993, Lawrence Poirier's coming out generated controversy, with readers opposed to homosexuality threatening to cancel newspaper subscriptions. Johnston did receive supportive mail on the issue generally from social workers and politicians, who praised her for portraying it with realism and avoiding vulgarity. Opposed readers who believed that a homosexual character was highly inappropriate for a family-oriented strip wrote Johnston many letters. While few letters were vicious, Johnston did say that many who opposed the story arc did so in a poignant manner. Johnston said one that was particularly hurtful was from a longtime fan who said she felt it was against her conscience to continue reading the strip; the woman's letter did not have any foul remarks, but the envelope contained returned yellowed FBoFW strips the fan had kept for a long time on her refrigerator. Over 100 newspapers (including New Hampshire's Union Leader) ran replacement strips during this part of the story or cancelled the comic altogether. Much more favourable was the article "Coming Out in the Comic Strips", by David Applegate, current editor of the CFA-APA, which ran in Hogan's Alley No. 1. Three years later, Lawrence introduced his boyfriend, giving rise to another, though smaller, uproar.

Explaining her decision to have Lawrence come out as gay, Johnston said that she had found the character, one of Michael's closest friends, gradually "harder and harder to bring... into the picture". Based on the fact the Pattersons were an average family in an average neighbourhood, she felt it only natural to introduce this element in Lawrence's character, and have the characters deal with the situation. After two years of development, Johnston contacted her editor, Lee Salem. Salem advised Johnston to send the strips well ahead of time so that he could review the plot and suggest any necessary changes. So long as there was no overt or licentious material, and Johnston was fully aware of what she was doing, Universal Press would support the action. Johnston's personal reflections on Lawrence, an excerpt from the comic collection It's the Thought That Counts..., are included on the strip's official webpage.

One result of the storyline was that Johnston was made a jury-selected "nominated finalist" for the Pulitzer Prize for Editorial Cartooning in 1994. The Pulitzer board said the strip "sensitively depicted a youth's disclosure of his homosexuality and its effect on his family and friends."

The story goes that Connie adopts a dog to deal with her pre-empty-nest syndrome, and as Michael and Lawrence are talking about her desire for grandchildren, Lawrence mentions that he probably will not be giving her any, and then confesses that he's in a relationship, but with another young man. Michael reacts in disbelief to the news and struggles to understand. Realizing that Lawrence is not "hot for him", Michael understands Lawrence sees him as a friend and not a lover. Michael then insists that Lawrence needs to tell his parents. Lawrence himself is unsure of this, claiming that he really ought to see his family's view on homosexuals and that it could be hurtful to them if he comes out, which is not his intent, but Michael retorts, "it'll be a lie if you don't". Hearing the news, Connie reacts with desperate denial, then orders her husband Greg to speak to him. Greg throws Lawrence out of the house, challenging him to see if "his kind" will take care of him the way Connie and Greg have all these years.

In the middle of the night, Elly wakens Michael and tells him to find Lawrence (as he was the primary instigator). Connie and Greg fought for hours over Greg's banishment of Lawrence, and now Connie simply wants Lawrence back. Michael locates his friend at a donut shop, where they talk until dawn, and Lawrence ultimately returns home, welcomed by Connie and an apologetic Greg, who tells Lawrence that he accepts him as long as his son endeavours to be a good man, and address life afterward with "Que Sera Sera". From this, Connie decides to name the new dog "Sera". Johnston had originally stated she was going to address the issue once then leave it alone; however, she eventually wrote future story arcs about Lawrence's homosexuality.

In 2001, when Michael chose Lawrence to be best man at his wedding to Deanna, Johnston ran two sets of comic strips. In the primary storyline, Deanna's mother Mira Sobinski objects to having a gay man in the wedding party, while in the alternate storyline, which used the same art but modified the dialogue, she instead objects to the flowers that Lawrence, by this time a professional landscape architect, has given Michael and Deanna to decorate the church. The alternate storyline was for newspapers who had not originally published the 1993 debut of Lawrence's homosexuality.

In 2007 when she was asked about why she did the storyline, Johnston said,

Mtigwaki
Mtigwaki is a fictional Ojibwe community in Northern Ontario near Lake Nipigon, where Elizabeth Patterson taught from 2004 to 2006. While in school, Elizabeth took a practice teaching job in Garden Village near North Bay.

The community was created with Baloney & Bannock comic creator Perry McLeod-Shabogesic, of the N'biising Nation (Anishinabek Crane Clan). McLeod-Shabogesic worked with Johnston to create an authentic world for the characters to inhabit. His son, Falcon Skye McLeod-Shabogesic, created the Mtigwaki First Nation's logo, which is inspired in part by a dreamcatcher, and his wife Laurie assisted Johnston with the Ojibwa language and was written directly into the strip as a teaching assistant in Elizabeth's classroom. Mtigwaki is shown like many Indigenous villages, with private houses, a meeting hall, a medical station and a casino.

For the series of strips in Mtigwaki, Johnston was awarded the Debwewin Citation for excellence in Aboriginal issues journalism by the Union of Ontario Indians in 2004.

2007 and 2008 changes
Johnston had planned to retire in the fall of 2007, but in January 2007, she announced that she instead would be tweaking her strip's format beginning September 2007. Storylines would now focus primarily on the second-generation family of one of the original children; scenes and artwork from older strips would be reused in new contexts; and the characters would stop aging. Johnston announced that the changes were to provide more time for travel and to accommodate health problems, including a neurological condition (dystonia) she controlled with medication.

In September 2007, Johnston said she and her husband, Rod, were separated and probably would divorce, telling the Kansas City Star,
... I have a new life. My husband and I have separated. I am now free to do just about anything I want to do. We still communicate. We still have children in common. It’s a positive thing for both of us. And I just see so many things in the future.

But when asked if this would be a storyline for the strip, Johnston replied, "No, not a chance. I only want to live through this once." Johnston said in September 2007 that she would continue to produce new installments.

The changes in the strip over the next year were not major, although, as announced, the stories did focus more on Michael, Elizabeth and April than on Elly and John.

During the summer of 2008, Elizabeth and Anthony carry out their wedding plans, which culminate in a ceremony that takes place in late August. This joyous occasion is marred by a crisis: Grandpa Jim has had another heart attack.  Elizabeth hears about this after the ceremony and visits her grandfather and her step-grandmother, Iris, in the hospital. Jim is hanging on and responding with his post-stroke responses of "yes" and "no".  In the final daily strip, Iris gives advice to Elizabeth and Anthony, who are both touched by her devotion to Jim. The strip concluded with Iris saying "It's a promise that should last a lifetime. It defines you as a person and describes your soul. It's a promise to be there, one for the other, no matter what happens, no matter who falls ... For better or for worse, my dears ... for better or for worse".  This final daily strip had a message from Lynn Johnston saying, "This concludes my story ... with grateful thanks to everyone who has made this all possible. ~Lynn Johnston".

The Sunday strip on August 31, 2008, revealed what each character would do in years to come. Elly and John retire to travel, volunteer in the community, and help raise their four grandchildren. Elizabeth continues to teach.  She and Anthony have a child, James Allen, presumably named in honour of his great-grandfather Jim Richards. Grandpa Jim lives to welcome the child, then passes away at age 89 with Iris at his bedside. Anthony continues to manage Mayes Motors and its various related businesses, introduces Elizabeth to ballroom dancing, and hopes to eventually open a bed-and-breakfast.  Michael has four books published before signing a film contract. Deanna opens a sewing school and teaches Robin how to cook. Meredith enters dance and theatre. April graduates from university with a degree in veterinary medicine. Following her established love of horses, she gets a job in Calgary working with the Calgary Stampede, continues to live in western Canada, and has an unnamed boyfriend there.

Reruns
In the last panel of the strip's original run (August 31, 2008), along with a caricature of herself at the drawing table, Lynn Johnston thanked everyone for supporting her and concluded with, "If I could do it all over again... Would I do some things differently?... I've been given the chance to find out!! Please join me on Monday as the story begins again... With new insights and new smiles.  Looking back looks wonderful!"

The next day, September 1, For Better or For Worse ran as usual, but Michael was once again a small boy, asking his young mother, Elly, to get him a puppy.  This began what Johnston called "new-runs", restarting her storyline with a roughly 50/50 mixture of reruns of early strips, and re-workings of 1980s strips that featured the original artwork (sometimes slightly retouched) with new dialogue.  The time frame appeared to be 29 years before the present day; the family is correspondingly younger. Michael looks to be about five or six years old, Elizabeth is a small child learning to talk, and the family is also raising a puppy.

For the next 22 months, the strip ran in this format.  On July 12, 2010, without fanfare, the strip quietly switched to straight reruns of material from the 1980s. However, these straight reruns have had slight alterations as well. The daily strips, which were originally inked, have been digitally colourized.  In the December 31, 2012, installment, dialogue that referred to the initial date of publication (1984) was altered, so that the strip was seen to be taking place in the present day. Another slight touch up to show a present-day timeline is where a child Michael invites his friends over to play on a video game console he recently got as a present and they are seen using a Nintendo Wii; in the original strip a second generation video game console was played.  Some strips have had altered panels, in particular those dealing with child discipline, because of the increased social and cultural opposition to corporal punishment. Occasionally in the original strips Michael or Elizabeth would be spanked. The new strips have modified the artwork to eliminate the device of stars coming out children's butts denoting the after-effect of a spanking, or in certain cases, have made a whole new panel to change the punishment to a "time out" (being made to sit in a corner or like isolation) instead of a spanking.

Legacy

The strip is perhaps best known for the fact that, unlike most comic strips, it took place more or less in real time for most of its run. Michael and Elizabeth were a young child and a toddler at the strip's beginning, and by the end had grown into adults, with Michael married and raising his own children while Elizabeth married at the end of the strip. Youngest child April was born 11 years into the strip's run and was 17 at the strip's conclusion.

During its run, the strip was also celebrated for its realism, eschewing cartoon stereotypes in favour of a nuanced, relatable look at typical adult, child and teen concerns. A storyline in which the supporting character Lawrence came out as gay cemented this reputation, as well as various stories dealing with prejudice, bullying, the mentally and physically handicapped, theft, cheating and abuse. The Pattersons were often shown as a good, "normal" family, often forced to deal with others from broken homes or worse situations.

Bibliography

Animated series and specials
In 1985, Atkinson Film-Arts of Ottawa, in association with the CTV Television Network, produced an animated Christmas special based on For Better or for Worse entitled The Bestest Present. In the USA, it was first broadcast on HBO, and in later years, on The Disney Channel. Lynn's own children, Aaron and Katie, provided the voices of Michael and Elizabeth, and Rod Johnston made a cameo appearance as the voice of a mailman.

Beginning in 1992, another Ottawa-based studio, Lacewood Productions, produced six more specials, also for CTV. In the USA, these were seen on The Disney Channel. According to Lynn Johnston, the set designs (for instance, for the Pattersons' house) which these and subsequent television programs required led her to develop a much more sophisticated background style in the comic strips, with the layouts of homes and even towns consistent from story to story.

The six specials produced by Lacewood were:
 The Last Camping Trip (July 1992)
 The Good-for-Nothing (Halloween) (November 1992)
 A Christmas Angel (December 1992)
 A Valentine from the Heart (February 7, 1993)
 The Babe Magnet (a.k.a. The Sweet Deal) (September 1993)
 A Storm in April (June 1995)

In 2000, Ottawa's Funbag Animation produced a new animated series for cable television network Teletoon, which began airing on November 5, 2000, and ran until December 16, 2001. Featuring introductions by Lynn Johnston herself, the show looked at three related storylines from three different eras of the strip—the mid-1980s, the early 1990s, and the late 1990s.

The series consisted of two seasons with eight episodes each. On March 23, 2004, Koch Vision released the complete series on DVD.

Exhibits
In 2001, Visual Arts Brampton's Artway Gallery exhibited Johnston's work.

See also

References

External links
 For Better or For Worse, official website
 Ned Tanner, official website
 For Better or For Worse at Don Markstein's Toonopedia. Archived from the original on July 30, 2016.
 Popular comic strip ignites controversy

1979 comics debuts
2000s Canadian animated television series
2000 Canadian television series debuts
2000 Canadian television series endings
2008 comics endings
Canadian children's animated comedy television series
Canadian television series with live action and animation
Canadian comic strips
Comedy-drama comics
Comics about married people
Comics adapted into animated series
Comics adapted into television series
Gag-a-day comics
GLAAD Media Award for Outstanding Comic Book winners
LGBT-related comic strips
Ontario in fiction
Slice of life comics
Teletoon original programming